Scipione Sacco (or Sacchi) (1495–1558) was an Italian painter of the Renaissance, active near or in Cesena.

He is referred to as a likely pupil or strongly influenced by Raphael. Born in the town of Sogliano al Rubicone, he painted a Pope St Gregory for the cathedral of Cesena in 1545. For the church of San Domenico of Cesena, he painted a Death of St Peter Martyr.

He died in Cesena.

References

1495 births
1558 deaths
People from Sogliano al Rubicone
15th-century Italian painters
Italian male painters
16th-century Italian painters
Italian Renaissance painters